This is a list of Members of the Australian Parliament who have served in both the Senate and the House of Representatives.

Section 43 of the Constitution of Australia says: "A member of either House of the Parliament shall be incapable of being chosen or of sitting as a member of the other House".

Consequently, a member of one house who wishes to transfer to the other house must resign from the first house before the election or appointment to the other house.  A person may simultaneously stand for election to both houses, and if successful in both bids, must choose which house he or she will be a member of.  No person has ever successfully stood for election to both houses at the same time.

The following list comprises 50 people (44 men and 6 women).  Of these:
 29 people were members of the House of Representatives before joining the Senate
 21 people were members of the Senate before joining the House of Representatives.

The first person to have been a member of both houses was James McColl (Victoria), on 1 January 1907.  All the other states and territories are represented in the list, the first person from each being:
 Queensland: William Higgs, 13 April 1910
 South Australia: William Story, 5 May 1917
 New South Wales: Josiah Thomas, 1 July 1917
 Tasmania: David O'Keefe, 16 December 1922
 Western Australia: Thomas Marwick, 21 December 1940
 Northern Territory: Grant Tambling, 11 July 1987
 Australian Capital Territory: Bob McMullan, 2 March 1996.

The first woman to have been a member of both houses was Kathy Sullivan (Qld), on 1 December 1984.

In the 46th Parliament:
 three senators (David Fawcett, Pauline Hanson and Deborah O'Neill) were previously members of the House of Representatives, and 
 four members of the House of Representatives (David Feeney, Barnaby Joyce, David Smith and Matt Thistlethwaite) were previously senators.

Only two people have gone from one house to another and later returned to the first house:
 Jack Duncan-Hughes, House of Representatives 1922–28, Senate 1931–38, House of Representatives 1940–43
 Sir Philip McBride, House of Representatives 1931–37, Senate 1937–44, House of Representatives 1946–58

No member of this list has yet served the Parliament for an aggregate period of 30 years or more.  The longest-serving person who has been a member of both houses was Bronwyn Bishop, who was in the Senate for 6 years 229 days, and in the House of Representatives for 22 years 44 days, a total of 28 years 274 days.  The shortest-serving person was Thomas Marwick (1 year 65 days in the Senate; 2 years 244 days in the House of Representatives; a total of 3 years 309 days).

There are a number of members who represented different states or territories in the House of Representatives during their career. No person has ever represented more than one state or territory in the Senate. The only person who has ever represented one state or territory in one House and a different state or territory in the other House is Barnaby Joyce (Senate, Queensland, 2005–13; House of Representatives, Division of New England, New South Wales, 2013–17, 2017-).

List of people who have served in both houses
The list is in chronological order based on the date on which the person began their term in the second chamber (in bold).

References

Sources
 Parliamentary Handbook: Members who have served in both chambers
 Parliamentary Handbook: Members of the Senate since 1901
 Parliamentary Handbook: Members of the House of Representatives since 1901

 
 
Members of the Parliament of Australia
Lists of legislators in Australia